MS Sunward II (also known as Cunard Adventurer, Triton and Coral ) was a cruise ship in service for Louis Cruises until 2011. She was a Cunard Line cruise ship that operated from 1971 to 1977. She was the first of the company's vessels in the 20th century to bear a name that did not end in "ia" or begin with "Queen." Sold in 1977, Cunard Adventurer became Sunward II for Norwegian Cruise Line. During her refit, her -style funnel was removed and replaced by a NCL-style funnel. In April 2005 she was sold at auction to Louis Cruises.

As Coral she sailed in the Mediterranean Sea and Greek islands until 2011.

Louis announced in May 2013 that for the 2014 season, Coral was to be renamed Louis Rhea, to reflect the company's Hellenic heritage.  However, in December the plans were cancelled and she was reported to have been sold to a scrap firm in Aliağa, Turkey and subsequently to Alang, India. She arrived in Alang for breaking on 30 January 2014.

References

External links
 
 Cunard Adventurer at Fakta om Fartyg 
 Professional photographs from shipspotting.com

Ships of the Cunard Line
Ships of Celestyal Cruises
1971 ships